Switzerland competed at the 1906 Intercalated Games in Athens, Greece. Nine athletes, all men, competed in fourteen events in three sports.

Medalists

Athletics

Cycling

Shooting

References

Nations at the 1906 Intercalated Games
1906
Intercalated Games